Yorkfield is the code name for some Intel processors sold as Core 2 Quad and Xeon.
In Intel's Tick-Tock cycle, the 2007/2008 "Tick" was Penryn microarchitecture, the shrink of the Core microarchitecture to 45 nanometers as CPUID model 23, replacing Kentsfield, the previous model.

Like its predecessor, Yorkfield multi-chip modules come in two sizes.  The smaller version is equipped with 6MB L2 cache, and is commonly called Yorkfield-6M.  The larger version is equipped with 12 MB L2 cache. 

The mobile version of Yorkfield is Penryn-QC and the dual-socket server version is Harpertown. The MP server Dunnington chip is a more distant relative based on a different chip but using the same 45 nm Core microarchitecture. The Wolfdale desktop processor is a dual-core version of Yorkfield. 

The successors to Yorkfield are the Nehalem based Lynnfield and Bloomfield.

Variants

Yorkfield

Yorkfield (codename for the Core 2 Quad Q9x5x series and Xeon X33x0 series) features a dual-die quad core design with two unified 6 MB L2 caches; their product code is 80569. They also feature 1333 MT/s FSB and are compatible with the Bearlake chipset. These processors were released in late March 2008 beginning with the Q9300 and Q9450. 
Yorkfield CPUs were expected to be released in January 2008. The release of Yorkfield, however, was delayed to March 15, 2008. Initially this delay was attributed to an error found in the Yorkfield chip, but later reports claimed that the delay was necessary in order to ensure compatibility with the 4-layer printed circuit boards utilized by many mainstream motherboards. At the Intel Developer Forum 2007, a Yorkfield processor was compared with a Kentsfield processor.

Yorkfield-6M

Yorkfield-6M (product code 80580) are similar to Yorkfield but are made from two Wolfdale-3M like cores, so they have a total of 6 MB of L2 cache, with 3 MB shared by two cores. They are used in Core 2 Quad Q8xxx with 4 MB cache enabled and Core 2 Quad Q9xxx and Xeon X3320/X3330 processors with all of the 6 MB enabled. Q8xxx processors initially had no support for Intel VT unlike Q9xxx, but later versions all have VT enabled.

Yorkfield XE

On November 11, 2007, Intel released the first Yorkfield XE processor, Core 2 Extreme QX9650. It is the first Intel desktop processor to use 45 nm technology and high-k metal gates. Yorkfield features a dual-die quad core design with two unified level-two (L2) caches of 6 MB each. It also features a 1333 MT/s FSB and clock rate of 3 GHz. The processor incorporates SSE4.1 instructions and has total of 820 million transistors on 2x107 mm² dies.
QX9650 and QX9770 both are labeled as product code 80569 like Yorkfield, while QX9775, being made for Dual Socket 771 mainboards, uses product code 80574 like the Xeon X5482 "Harpertown" that it is closely related to.

Yorkfield CL 

The OEM-only Xeon X33x3 processors with 80 W TDP and product code 80584 are made for Socket 771 like Harpertown but are only supported in single-socket configurations. Like the dual-core Wolfdale-CL processor, these would work in regular Socket 775 mainboards after modification but are typically used in blade servers that otherwise require DP server processors like Wolfdale-DP or Harpertown.

Successor 
Yorkfield was replaced by the 45 nm Nehalem processor.

See also 
 Core (microarchitecture)
 Kentsfield (microprocessor)
 Wolfdale (microprocessor)
 Penryn (microprocessor)#Penryn-QC
 Harpertown (microprocessor)
 Lynnfield (microprocessor)
 Bloomfield (microprocessor)
 Celeron
 Pentium Dual-Core
 Intel Core 2

References 

Intel microprocessors